Andrew William Hayward is an English former footballer who played as either a midfielder or a striker.

Hayward started his career in non-league football, and his prolific goalscoring record soon attracted attention from bigger clubs. He turned professional at the age of 24, joining Rotherham United from Frickley Athletic in 1994. He played 120 league games in four seasons before leaving the club in 1998. Whilst at Rotherham he was a part of the team that won the 1996 Football League Trophy Final. He has since played for numerous teams in non-league football.

He signed for Hednesford Town, and had a brief loan spell with Doncaster Rovers. He then moved on to Barrow in February 1999, and helped the club secure survival in the Football Conference league when he scored the opening goal in a 2–1 win against Kidderminster Harriers on the last day of the season. He returned to his old club Frickley Athletic, before being signed by Bradford Park Avenue in September 2000 for a club record fee. He stayed there for several seasons before moving on to Stalybridge Celtic in March 2004. He stayed there until the summer of 2005, scoring 16 goals in 46 appearances.

He went on to play for Ossett Town, playing 53 times and scoring 32 goals, and North Ferriby United. He returned for a third spell at Frickley Athletic, this time as a player-assistant manager before joining Garforth Town.

He last played for Royston Railway in the Barnsley Sunday league football and currently works as a PE instructor at a school in Wakefield.

References

External links

Profile at doncasterrovers.co.uk

1970 births
Living people
Footballers from Barnsley
English footballers
Association football midfielders
Frickley Athletic F.C. players
Rotherham United F.C. players
Woking F.C. players
Hednesford Town F.C. players
Doncaster Rovers F.C. players
Stalybridge Celtic F.C. players
Barrow A.F.C. players
Bradford (Park Avenue) A.F.C. players
Ossett Town F.C. players
North Ferriby United A.F.C. players
Garforth Town A.F.C. players
English Football League players
National League (English football) players